Kaifu may refer to:

Places 

Kaifu District, Changsha, Hunan, China
, Tokushima Prefecture, Japan
, a town in Kaifu District, Tokushima

Persons 

, Japanese astronomer
, 76th and 77th Prime Minister of Japan

Japanese-language surnames